John Campbell (born 2 January 1936 in Valleyfield, Quebec) is a former Liberal party member of the House of Commons of Canada. He was an insurance agent and businessman by career.

From 1967 to 1980, he was a Lasalle city councilor. He won the Lasalle electoral district in the 1972 federal election and was re-elected in the 1974, 1979 and 1980 federal elections. In the 1984 federal election, he was defeated by Claude Lanthier of the Progressive Conservative party. He served four consecutive terms from the 29th Canadian Parliament through the 32nd Canadian Parliament.

Electoral record (incomplete)

References

External links
 

1936 births
Living people
Members of the House of Commons of Canada from Quebec
Liberal Party of Canada MPs
People from Salaberry-de-Valleyfield
Anglophone Quebec people